Yacine Hamza (born 18 April 1997) is an Algerian cyclist, who currently rides for Algeria club team Team Madar.

Major results

2015
 1st  Road race, Arab Junior Road Championships
2016
 5th Critérium International de Sétif
 7th Overall Tour International de Constantine
1st Young rider classification
2017
 1st  Road race, National Under-23 Road Championships
 1st  Team time trial, Arab Road Championships
 1st Stages 2 & 4 Tour d'Algérie
 2nd Overall Grand Prix International de la ville d'Alger
1st Stage 4
2018
 1st  Road race, National Under-23 Road Championships
 1st Stage 4 Tour International de la Wilaya d'Oran
 2nd  Road race, Arab Road Championships
 2nd Road race, National Road Championships
 6th Overall Tour d'Algérie
1st Young rider classification
 7th Overall Grand Prix International de la ville d'Alger
1st Young rider classification
1st Stage 3
2019
 1st Overall Tour des Aéroports
1st Stages 1 & 2
 1st Stage 4 Grand Prix Chantal Biya
 2nd  Road race, African Under-23 Road Championships
 3rd  Road race, Arab Road Championships
 5th Road race, African Games
 7th Road race, African Road Championships
 Challenge du Prince
8th Trophée Princier
10th Trophée de la Maison Royale
 10th Overall Tour of Kayseri
2020
 3rd Grand Prix Manavgat–Side
2021
 Tour du Faso
1st  Points classification
1st Stage 6
 1st Stage 4 Tour of Mevlana
 3rd Time trial, National Road Championships
2022
 1st Grand Prix Tomarza
 3rd Grand Prix Develi
 4th Time trial, National Road Championships
 6th Grand Prix Justiniano Hotels
2023
Tour d'Algérie	
1st  Points classification
1st Stages 2, 4, 7 & 8
 1st Stage 2 Tour of Sharjah
 2nd  Road race, African Road Championships

References

External links
 

1997 births
Living people
Algerian male cyclists
Place of birth missing (living people)
African Games competitors for Algeria
Competitors at the 2019 African Games
Competitors at the 2018 Mediterranean Games
Mediterranean Games competitors for Algeria
21st-century Algerian people
Competitors at the 2022 Mediterranean Games
20th-century Algerian people